Georg Schwabenland (born 14 December 1967) is a German wrestler. He competed in the men's freestyle 68 kg at the 1992 Summer Olympics.

References

1967 births
Living people
German male sport wrestlers
Olympic wrestlers of Germany
Wrestlers at the 1992 Summer Olympics
Sportspeople from Karlsruhe (region)
People from Rhein-Neckar-Kreis